Intel Core M is a family of ultra low-voltage microprocessors belonging to the Intel Core series and designed specifically for ultra-thin notebooks, 2-in-1 detachables, and other mobile devices. The thermal design power (TDP) of all Core M microprocessors is 5 watts or lower. Intel Core M microprocessors are generally used in fanless devices due to their low TDP.

Broadwell microarchitecture (5th generation)

"Broadwell-Y" (SoC, dual-core, 14 nm) 

 All models support: MMX, SSE, SSE2, SSE3, SSSE3, SSE4.1, SSE4.2, AVX, AVX2, FMA3, Enhanced Intel SpeedStep Technology (EIST), Intel 64, XD bit (an NX bit implementation), Intel VT-x, Intel VT-d, Hyper-threading, Turbo Boost, AES-NI, Smart Cache.
 All models except M-5Y10a and M-5Y70 support Configurable TDP.
 M-5Y70 and M-5Y71 also support Intel vPro.
 GPU and memory controller (up to 2 × DDR3-1600) are integrated onto the processor die.
 Peripherals include 12 lanes of PCI Express 2.0, in x4, x2, and x1 configurations.
 Package size: 30 mm × 16.5 mm
 Transistors: 1.3 billion
 Die size: 82 mm²

Skylake microarchitecture (6th generation)

"Skylake-Y" (SoC, dual-core, 14 nm) 

 All models support: MMX, SSE, SSE2, SSE3, SSSE3, SSE4.1, SSE4.2, AVX, AVX2, FMA3, Enhanced Intel SpeedStep Technology (EIST), Intel 64, XD bit (an NX bit implementation), Intel VT-x, Intel VT-d, Hyper-threading, Turbo Boost, AES-NI, Smart Cache, Configurable TDP.
 m5-6Y57 and m7-6Y75 also support Intel vPro, Intel TXT.
 GPU and memory controller (up to 2 × DDR3-1866) are integrated onto the processor die.
 Peripherals include 10 lanes of PCI Express 3.0, in x4, x2, and x1 configurations.
 Package size: 20 mm × 16.5 mm
 Transistors: TBD
 Die size: TBD

Kaby Lake microarchitecture (7th/8th generation)

"Kaby Lake-Y" (SoC, dual-core, 14 nm) 

Core m5 and Core m7 models were rebranded as Core i5 and Core i7.

 All models support: MMX, SSE, SSE2, SSE3, SSSE3, SSE4.1, SSE4.2, AVX, AVX2, FMA3, SGX, MPX, Enhanced Intel SpeedStep Technology (EIST), Intel 64, XD bit (an NX bit implementation), Intel VT-x, Intel VT-d, Hyper-threading, Turbo Boost, AES-NI, Smart Cache,  Configurable TDP.
 GPU and memory controller (up to 2 × LPDDR3-1866) are integrated onto the processor die.
 Peripherals include 10 lanes of PCI Express 3.0, in x4, x2, and x1 configurations.
 Package size: 20 mm × 16.5 mm
 Transistors: TBD
 Die size: TBD

"Amber Lake-Y" (dual-core, 14 nm)

See also 
 System on a chip (SoC)

References

External links 
 Intel Core M Processors Product Order Code Table
 Intel processor price list
 Intel 14nm technology

Core M
Intel Core M